Běla Hlaváčková (born 18 April 1976) is a Czech Paralympic swimmer. She has competed in two Summer Paralympics winning a total of five medals, including gold in the 50m freestyle at both Athens in 2004 and Beijing in 2008.

Career history
Hlaváčková was born in 1976 in Náchod which is now in the Czech Republic and took to swimming from the age of 9. In 1999 she had to undergo spinal surgery, but she never fully recovered. She now has to use a wheelchair. She married the same year.

in 2001 she won a gold, silver and two bronze medals at the European championships in the S5 category. In the world championships in Argentina she took a bronze medal in the 50m freestyle as well as establishing a world record time for the 50 metre backstroke. For this she received a gold medal.

Hlaváčková has a son.

References

1976 births
Living people
Swimmers at the 2004 Summer Paralympics
Swimmers at the 2008 Summer Paralympics
Medalists at the 2004 Summer Paralympics
Medalists at the 2008 Summer Paralympics
Paralympic gold medalists for the Czech Republic
Paralympic silver medalists for the Czech Republic
Paralympic bronze medalists for the Czech Republic
Paralympic swimmers of the Czech Republic
S5-classified Paralympic swimmers
University of South Bohemia alumni
Medalists at the World Para Swimming Championships
Medalists at the World Para Swimming European Championships
Paralympic medalists in swimming
Czech female freestyle swimmers
People from Náchod
Sportspeople from the Hradec Králové Region